Thomas Austin Hill (July 24, 1889 – June 25, 1937) was an American politician. He was a member of the Arkansas House of Representatives, serving from 1919 to 1927. He was a member of the Democratic party.

References

1937 deaths
1889 births
20th-century American politicians
Politicians from Pine Bluff, Arkansas
Speakers of the Arkansas House of Representatives
Democratic Party members of the Arkansas House of Representatives